The Indian Council of World Affairs (ICWA) is a New Delhi based Indian think-tank. Established in 1943, it was India’s first independent international affairs think tank. It was founded in 1943 when several members of the Indian Institute of International Affairs (IIIA) decided to form a separate institute. The ICWA affiliated itself with the Indian National Congress, whereas the IIIA supported the British Indian government.

By an Act of Parliament, it has been declared an institution of national importance in 2001. The Vice President of India is the ex-officio President of ICWA, while the Minister of External Affairs is its Vice-President. It is housed in Sapru House, the name being derived from Sir Tej Bahadur Sapru, who was also the founder President of the Council. ICWA is a member of the United Nations Academic Impact.

ICWA has been called by media as one of India's influential think-tanks, but is seen only as an extension of the Ministry of External Affairs.

See also
 Foreign relations of India
 Institute for Defence Studies and Analyses
 Observer Research Foundation
 Foreign Service Institute, India
 List of think tanks in India

References

External links
Official website

Think tanks based in India
Research institutes in Delhi
Research institutes of international relations
Organisations based in Delhi
Foreign policy and strategy think tanks in India